Malik Sohrab Dodai Hoth Baloch was a Baloch mercenary who moved to Multan (Punjab) in the late 15th century with his father Mir Doda Khan Hoth Baloch at the behest of the Langah sultanate dynasty.  Baloch.  He was accompanied by his sons, Ghazi Khan, Fateh Khan, and Ismail Khan.

This move is seen as the establishment of Baloch presence in the Derajat region, as Dodai was followed by fellow Baloch mercenaries.  Shah Hussain of Langah dynasty encouraged them by offering them lands extending from Kot Kehor (Karor Lal Esan) to Dhankot (present-day Muzaffargarh).

Sources
Glossary of the Tribes and Castes of the Punjab and North West Frontier Province. H. A. Rose, Ibbetson, Maclagan Published by Asian Educational Services, 1990 ,   
The Baloch race. A historical and ethnological sketch. M. Longworth Dames.  The Royal Asiatic Society, London, 1902.

References

History of Punjab, Pakistan
Baloch people

15th-century Asian people